Harold "Hal" Morgenstern is an American epidemiologist and professor of epidemiology at the University of Michigan in Ann Arbor.

Education
Morgenstern received his Bachelor of Architecture from the Massachusetts Institute of Technology in 1969. He then attended the University of North Carolina at Chapel Hill, where he received his Master of Regional Planning in 1974 and his Ph.D. in epidemiology in 1978.

Career
Morgenstern joined the faculty of the University of California, Los Angeles in 1985 as an associate professor of epidemiology, and became a full professor there in 1991. In 2003, he joined the faculty of the University of Michigan, originally as the Thomas Francis Jr. Chair of the Department of Epidemiology. He served in this capacity until 2008, and remains a professor of epidemiology there.

Research
Morgenstern is known for studying possible causes of cancer. Specifically, he has researched the possible carcinogenic effects of working at the Santa Susana Field Laboratory in Simi Valley, California, and recreational marijuana use, which he does not think causes cancer.

References

Cancer epidemiologists
University of Michigan faculty
Living people
MIT School of Architecture and Planning alumni
UNC Gillings School of Global Public Health alumni
1946 births
UCLA School of Public Health faculty
American epidemiologists